Gheorghe Ghimpu (26 July 1937 – 13 November 2000) was a Moldovan politician and a political prisoner in the former Soviet Union and then in Moldova.

Early life 
Ghimpu was born on 26 July 1937 in Colonița, a village in Bessarabia during the Greater Romania administration. His mother, Irina Ursu (daughter of Haralambie Ursu) died in 2003; she worked at the local kolkhoz (collective farm). His father, Toader Ghimpu (dead in 1980) was an elementary school teacher. Gheorghe Ghimpu is the oldest brother of Simion Ghimpu (born 24 May 1939), Visarion, Valentina (mother of Dorin Chirtoacă) and Mihai Ghimpu.

Ghimpu completed his studies at T. G. Shevchenko University in Tiraspol. Then he obtained his PhD at the Institute of Biological Physics, Academy of Sciences of the Soviet Union in Moscow. Ghimpu was a teacher in Strășeni and a professor at T. G. Shevchenko University in Tiraspol and the Moldova State University in Chișinău.

He was married to Zina and had two children, Oana and Corneliu.

Political activity 

Between 1969 and 1971, he was a founder of the clandestine National Patriotic Front of Bessarabia and North of Bukovina, established by several young intellectuals in Chişinău, totaling over 100 members, vowing to fight for the establishment of a Moldovan Democratic Republic, its secession from the Soviet Union and union with Romania. After the NPF leadership got in touch...In December 1971, following an informative note from Ion Stănescu, the President of the Council of State Security of the Romanian Socialist Republic, to Yuri Andropov, the chief of the KGB, Ghimpu as well as Alexandru Usatiuc-Bulgăr, Valeriu Graur, and Alexandru Șoltoianu were arrested and later sentenced to long prison terms. He was sentenced on 13 July 1972. Ghimpu spent six years in prison (1972–1978), as result of his political activities.

Ghimpu took part in the Moldovan national movement and was a supporter of the independence of the Moldovan SSR from the Soviet Union. He was a founding member of the Popular Front of Moldova and a member of the Moldovan Parliament (1990–1994).

He died in Chișinău on 13 November 2000 after an unclarified traffic accident, which had occurred near Dondușeni on 27 October 2000.

Legacy 
The Commission for the Study of the Communist Dictatorship in Moldova will study and analyze the 1940–1991 period of the communist regime.

Gallery

References

1937 births
2000 deaths
People from Colonița
Politicians from Chișinău
National Patriotic Front (Moldova) politicians
Popular Front of Moldova MPs
Moldovan MPs 1990–1994
Moldovan physicists
Moldovan people of Romanian descent
Road incident deaths in Moldova
Academic staff of Moldova State University
Academic staff of Shevchenko Transnistria State University
Moldovan independence activists